Daniel Francis (born February) is a British actor. He began his career in theatre. On television, he is known for his roles in Small Axe: Education (2020) and the Netflix miniseries Stay Close (2021).

Early life and education
Francis was raised by his mother in Battersea, South London. Having been shy growing up, he discovered acting through Pyramid Youth in Clapham. When he was seventeen, under the mentorship of theatre director Sacha Wares, Francis was cast in Bintou at the Arcola Theatre. He went on to train at the London Academy of Music and Dramatic Art (LAMDA).

Career
Upon graduating from LAMDA, Francis landed small roles in the Royal Shakespeare Company productions of The Comedy of Errors in Salford and Twelfth Night in Stratford-upon-Avon. He went on to star in The Brothers Size at the Young Vic, the stage adaptation of The Hounding of David Oluwale as the titular David Oluwale, and Off the Endz at the Royal Court Theatre.

Francis landed his first major onscreen role as Sgt Carl Haleford in the 2012 ITV war drama Homefront. That same year, he made his feature film debut as Sean Warren in the sports drama Fast Girls and played Black in Blackta, returning to the Young Vic. The following year, he played the titular role in the Singapore Repertory Theatre production of Othello.

In 2016, Francis played Martin Luther King Jr. in Katori Hall's The Mountaintop at the New Vic Theatre in Staffordshire. He joined the recurring cast of Once Upon a Time for its seventh and final season as Dr. Facilier or Baron Samdi.

In the meantime, Francis has worked as a personal development coach and consultant, and as a community manager for Hedera Hashgraph.

Francis played Esmond Smith in the Education installment of Steve McQueen's Small Axe anthology, which premiered in 2020. He also starred in Cops at Southwark Playhouse. He was then cast in Harlen Coben's 2021 Netflix mystery miniseries Stay Close as Dave Shaw.

Francis has upcoming roles in the Apple TV+ series Liaison, the second season of the Amazon Prime adaptation of The Wheel of Time, and the third season of the Netflix period drama Bridgerton.

Filmography

Film

Television

Stage

References

External links
 

Living people
21st-century English actors
Alumni of the London Academy of Music and Dramatic Art
Black British male actors
Male actors from London
English male Shakespearean actors
English male stage actors
English male television actors
People from Battersea
Year of birth missing (living people)